Alfred Gürtler (30 October 1875 – 15 March 1933) was an Austrian statistician, economist and politician who served as Austrian Finance Minister from 1921 to 1922. He was President of the National Council from 1928 to 1930. Before becoming a politician, Gürtler was a professor of statistics at the University of Graz.

References

1875 births
1933 deaths
People from Jablonné v Podještědí
People from the Kingdom of Bohemia
German Bohemian people
Christian Social Party (Austria) politicians
Finance Ministers of Austria
Government ministers of Austria
Members of the Constituent National Assembly (Austria)
Presidents of the National Council (Austria)
Governors of Styria
Austrian economists
Academic staff of the University of Graz